John Brandl (August 19, 1937 - August 18, 2008) was a Minnesota economist, state legislator and dean of the Hubert H. Humphrey School of Public Affairs at the University of Minnesota.  He also served as Deputy Assistant Secretary of the Department of Health, Education and Welfare during the Johnson Administration.

Born in St. Cloud, Minnesota, he graduated from Cathedral High School in 1955.  He earned an undergraduate degree in economics from St. John's University in Collegeville, Minnesota in 1959, followed by a master's degree and Ph.D. in economics from Harvard University in 1963. In 1968, he returned to Minnesota to become assistant professor at  the School of Public Affairs at the University of Minnesota. He rose to be Associate Professor and its director. The school later became part of the Hubert H. Humphrey School of Public Affairs, where he was dean from 1997 to 2002.

From 1977-78 and 1981–86, he  was a member of the  Minnesota House of Representatives for south Minneapolis; subsequently, he won a seat in the Minnesota Senate, where he served until 1990.

Brandl received  the Fordham Foundation Prize for Academic Excellence and the Governors Association Award for Distinguished Service to State Government. He served as regent of St. John's University and as president of the Citizens League of the Twin Cities.

References 

2008 deaths
Harvard Graduate School of Arts and Sciences alumni
1937 births
Members of the Minnesota House of Representatives
Minnesota state senators
College of Saint Benedict and Saint John's University alumni
University of Minnesota faculty
20th-century American politicians